Robert Freer may refer to:

Robert Freer (RAF officer) (1923–2012), Royal Air Force (RAF) officer
Robert Freer (physician) (1745–1827), English soldier and academic
Robert E. Freer (1896–1963), chair of the U.S. Federal Trade Commission